Naupactus cervinus, the Fuller rose beetle, is a species of broad-nosed weevil in the family Curculionidae.

References

Further reading

External links

 

Curculionidae
Beetles described in 1840